Afifabad (also Romanized as ‘Afīfābād; also known as ‘Anīfābād) is a village in Lay Siyah Rural District, in the Central District of Nain County, Isfahan Province, Iran. At the 2006 census, its population was 24, in 14 families.

References 

Populated places in Nain County